The Bell Public School is a school based in Stilwell, Oklahoma in the United States. On May 27, 2010, the Oklahoma Board of Education revoked the district's accreditation.

References

External links
 Bell School District
 Bell Overview

Schools in Adair County, Oklahoma
Public high schools in Oklahoma